This is a list of rice cultivars, also known as rice varieties. There are several species of grain called rice. Asian rice (Oryza sativa) is most widely known and most widely grown, with two major subspecies (indica and japonica) and over 40,000 varieties. Also included in this list are varieties of African rice (Oryza glaberrima) and wild rice (genus Zizania).

Rice may vary in genetics, grain length, color, thickness, stickiness, aroma, growing method, and other characteristics, leading to many cultivars. For instance, over nine major rice cultivars exist to make sake alone. The two subspecies of Asian rice, indica and japonica, can generally be distinguished by length and stickiness. Indica rice is long-grained and unsticky, while japonica is short-grained and glutinous.

Rice can also be divided based on processing type into the two broad categories of brown and white. Brown rice is whole grain, with only the inedible hull of the seed removed, while white rice additionally has the bran and germ removed through the process of milling. Milled rice may not necessarily actually be white in color; there are purple, black, and red variants of rice, which can be eaten whole grain or milled.

The cultivars listed in this article may vary in any number of these characteristics, and most can be eaten whole grain or milled (brown or white). However, there are often strong cultural preferences for one or the other, depending on variety and region.

North American varieties 

 Texas rice
 Texmati 
 Brazos
 Gulfrose
 Madison
 Pecos
 Rico
 Wild rice (Zizania aquatica)

California varieties 

 California New Variety rice
 Calhikari-201
 Calmati-201
 Calmochi rice
 Caloro
 Calrose rice
 Calusa
 Nishiki rice
 Wehani rice

Canadian varieties 

 Northern Wild rice (also known as Canadian Wild rice (Zizania palustris))

Carolina varieties 

 Carolina Gold
 Charleston Gold

Texas varieties 

Texas rice 
Texas wild rice (Zizania texana)

Louisiana varieties 

 Blue Rose
 Earl
 Mercury
 Nato
 Pecan rice
 Popcorn rice
 Vista

African varieties 
 Abakaliki rice
 Grown in the states of Abakaliki and Ebonyi in eastern Nigeria
 Cultivated thrice a year
 Sweet and easy to cook
 African rice
 Ekpoma rice
 New Rice for Africa
 Ofada rice
 Grown in Ofada, Nigeria
 Aromatic

Australian varieties 

 Doongara
semi-dwarf long grain, hard cooking (high amylose)
 Illabong
semi-dwarf arborio style
 Koshihikari
tall short grain Japonica style
 Kyeema
tall long grain, fragrant
 Langi
semi-dwarf long grain, soft jade cooking (low amylose)
 Opus
semi-dwarf short grain Japonica style
 Reiziq
semi-dwarf medium grain
 Sherpa
semi-dwarf medium grain
 Topaz
semi-dwarf fragrant long grain

Bangladeshi varieties

Bhutanese varieties 

 Bhutanese red rice

Burmese varieties
 Midon
 Paw hsan hmwe
 Emahta
Letyezin
Ngasein
Byat
 Black glutinous rice
 White glutinous rice

Cambodian varieties 
 Bonla Pdao
 Cammalis – extra long jasmine rice
 Long Rice
 Neang Khon
 Neang Minh – long grain rice
 Phka Khnhei – fragrant variety,  meaning "flower"
 Phkar Malis – Cambodia Jasmine Rice
 Senchey Brand, សែនជ័យ ប្រេន is a Low glycemic Index Rice (GI=55) (medium grain, photosensitive period, traditional seeds
 Senkraob 
 Won the National Best Rice Award in 2017 have been certified as Medium Glycemic Index (GI) of 62 based on rigorous testing performed by Temasek Polytechnic Glycemic Index Research Unit (GIRU) 
 Phka Romdul
 Red Rice
 White rice
 Sen Pi Dao
 Riang cheay()
 Srauv Pong Rolork
 Srauv Ha Mort 
 Srauv IR     

Chinese varieties 
 Black Asian
 Manchurian Wild rice (Zizania latifolia)
 Oryza rufipogon

Dominican varieties 
 Cristal 100
 Idiaf 1
 Inglés Corto
 Inglés Largo
 Juma 57
 Juma 58
 Juma 66
 Juma 67
 Prosequisa 4
 Prosequisa 5
 Prosequisa 10
 Toño Brea
 Yocahú CFX-18

French varieties 
 Camargue red rice

Greek varieties 

 Blue Rose
 Carolina
 Glassé
Nychaki
Parboiled

Indian varieties
Until 1970, India had about 110,000 varieties of rice and now it has about 6,000 varieties.

Rice varieties of Punjab and Haryana 
Basmati and premium non-basmati rice grows in Punjab and Haryana region of India, such as:

 Traditional Basmati Rice
 Basmati 30,31 
 PUSA Basmati Rice
 1121 Basmati Rice
 1509 Basmati Rice
 1718 Basmati Rice
 Sugandha Rice
 Sharbati Rice
RH-10 Rice
 Parmal 11 or PR11 Rice
 Parmal 14 or PR14 Rice
 Parmal 47 or PR 47 Rice
 Parmal 106 or PR 106 Rice

Rice varieties of Andhra Pradesh 
Andhra Pradesh are home to hundreds of rice varieties, such as:

Rice varieties of Karnataka

Rice varieties of Odisha 

 Nalihati (non-aromatic) 
 Padmakeshari (aromatic)
 Kalamoti (aromatic) 
 Balami (aromatic) 
 Kalajiri (aromatic) 
 Tulasibasa (aromatic) 
 Pimpudibasa (aromatic) 
 Swarna (non-aromatic)
 Nalabainsi (non-aromatic)
 Pateni (non-aromatic)
 Ratna (IET-1411)

Rice varieties of Kerala

Rice varieties of Tamil Nadu

Rice varieties of Telangana 
Indur Samba 
Bathukamma
RNR 15048 or Telangana Sona or Karnataka Sona
Improved Samba Mahsuri

West Bengal rice varieties 
There are possibly up to 82,700 varieties of rice extant in India, and of those more than 5000 were found in West Bengal. However, only 150 of them are commonly grown. Many are grown organically to compete with more modern cultivars. The Agricultural Training Centre of West Bengal exists to conserve and promote the use of folk rice varieties, including many listed below.

Indonesian rice varieties/landraces 
In Indonesia, there are at least 45 varieties of rice for wet-field production (sawah) and 150 varieties of rice for dry-field production.

Iranian varieties 
Many varieties of rice are cultivated in Iran. A few of them are listed below.
 Ambarboo
 Binam
 Domsiah
 Gerdeh
 Gharib
 Hasan Sarai
 Hasani
 Hashemi
 Kamfiruzi 
 Grown in Fars Province along the Kor River
 Lenjan 
 Grown in Isfahan Province along the Zayandeh Rud River
 Salari
 Sang Tarom
 Tarom
 Tarom Roushan
 tarom omid

Italian varieties

Japanese varieties 
 Kitaake

Malaysian varieties

Nepali varieties

Pakistani varieties

Philippine varieties

Portuguese varieties 
 Ariete
 Arroz da terra
 Carolino
 Ponta rubra
 Valtejo

Sri Lankan varieties

Spanish varieties 

 Albufera (premium pearly round rice)
 Bahia (pearly round rice)
 Balilla x Sollana  (pearly round rice)
 Bomba (premium pearly round rice)
 Fonsa (pearly round rice)
 Gleva (pearly round rice)
 Guadiamar (crystalline medium rice)
 J.Sendra (pearly round rice)
 Marisma (pearly round rice)
 Puntal (crystalline long rice)
 Senia (pearly round rice)

Taiwanese varieties 
 
 Taichung 65 
 Taichung Native-1

Thai varieties 

 Black glutinous rice
 Jasmine rice
 Red Cargo rice
 Riceberry
 White glutinous rice

Vietnamese varieties 
 Dự Hương Rice
 Nàng Thơm Chợ Đào Rice 
 grown in  Mỹ Lệ commune, Cần Đước district, Long An province
 Nếp cái hoa vàng
 grown in Nam Dinh province
 Nếp cẩm Rice
 Nếp Tú Lệ
 Tài Nguyên Rice
 grown in Long An province
 Tám Xoan Rice
 grown in  Hải Hậu district, Nam Dinh province
 ST24 Rice - Top 3 the world best rice awarded 2018
 ST25 Rice - The 1st the world best rice awarded 2019
 Cultivating in Soc Trang Province - Mekong Delta Area (Southern Vietnam), researching and developing by Mr.Hồ Văn Cua (Agricultural Engineer) and his team.
 Long grain rice with fragrant, soft, best tasty.

See also 
 International Code of Nomenclature for Cultivated Plants
 List of rice diseases
 Lists of cultivars

References 

Lists of cultivars
Lists of foods by ingredient